Pankaj Kumar Rao (born 19 October 1989) is an Indian cricketer. He made his first-class debut for Chhattisgarh in the 2016–17 Ranji Trophy on 13 October 2016. He made his Twenty20 debut for Chhattisgarh in the 2016–17 Inter State Twenty-20 Tournament on 30 January 2017.

He was the leading wicket-taker for Chhattisgarh in the 2018–19 Vijay Hazare Trophy, with fifteen dismissals in six matches. He was also the leading wicket-taker for Chhattisgarh in the 2018–19 Ranji Trophy, with 29 dismissals in eight matches.

References

External links
 

1989 births
Living people
Indian cricketers
Madhya Pradesh cricketers
Chhattisgarh cricketers
Place of birth missing (living people)